

Drugs and therapeutic agents administered by inhalation

Inhalational anesthetic agents
 aliflurane
 chloroform
 cyclopropane
 desflurane
 diethyl ether
 halothane
 isoflurane
 methoxyflurane
 methoxypropane
 nitrous oxide
 roflurane
 sevoflurane
 teflurane
 trichloroethylene
 vinyl ether
 xenon

Bronchodilators
Arformoterol
Bitolterol
Epinephrine
Fenoterol
Formoterol
Ipratropium
Isoetharine
Isoproterenol
Levalbuterol
Metaproterenol
Pirbuterol
Procaterol
Racepinephrine (racemic epinephrine)
Salbutamol
Salmeterol
Terbutaline
Tiotropium

Anti-hypertensives
Amyl nitrite
Iloprost (Prostacyclin)
Nitric oxide

Anti-inflammatories
Beclomethasone
Budesonide
Ciclesonide
Cromolyn
Dexamethasone
Flunisolide
Fluticasone
Mometasone
Nedocromil
Triamcinolone

Antimicrobials
Pentamidine
Ribavirin
Tobramycin
Zanamivir

Pulmonary surfactants
Beractant
Calfactant
Colfosceril
Poractant alfa

Sympathomimetic amines
Amphetamine (Benzedrine)
Levomethamphetamine (Vicks Vapor Inhaler)
Propylhexedrine (Benzedrex)

Miscellaneous
Aromatic ammonia
Dornase alfa
Glutathione
Insulin
Methacholine
Nicotine
Sodium chloride

Common inhalers
 nail polish remover
glue
paint thinner
computer cleaner
correction fluids

Inhalants
 Medical